Ciboria is a genus of fungi in the family Sclerotiniaceae. The widespread genus, which currently contains about 21 species, was circumscribed by the German botanist Karl Fuckel in 1870.

Species
Ciboria acerina
Ciboria aestivalis
Ciboria alni
Ciboria amentacea
Ciboria americana
Ciboria aschersoniana
Ciboria batschiana
Ciboria betulae
Ciboria carunculoides
Ciboria caucus
Ciboria cistophila
Ciboria juncorum
Ciboria rufofusca
Ciboria seminicola
Ciboria shiraiana
Ciboria viridifusca

References

Sclerotiniaceae
Helotiales genera
Taxa named by Karl Wilhelm Gottlieb Leopold Fuckel
Taxa described in 1870